Montillières-sur-Orne (literally Montillières on Orne) is a commune in the Calvados department in northwestern France. The municipality was established on 1 January 2019 by merger of the former communes of Trois-Monts and Goupillières.

See also
Communes of the Calvados department

References

Communes of Calvados (department)
Populated places established in 2019
2019 establishments in France